Sardar-e Jangal Rural District is a rural district (dehestan) in Sardar-e Jangal District, Fuman County, Gilan Province, Iran. At the 2006 census, its population (including Maklavan, which was subsequently detached from the rural district and promoted to city status) was 10,311, in 2,739 families; excluding Maklavan, the population in 2006 was 8,621, in 2,297. The rural district has 41 villages.

References 

Rural Districts of Gilan Province
Fuman County